Deron Mayo (born March 28, 1988) is an  American football coach and former linebacker who is the assistant strength and conditioning coach for the New England Patriots of the National Football League (NFL). He played college football at Old Dominion University. He was signed with the Denver Broncos as an undrafted free agent in 2011. Mayo also played for the Calgary Stampeders of the Canadian Football League (CFL).

Early years
Mayo attended Kecoughtan High School in Hampton, Virginia where he played football. He was selected to the All-Peninsula District first-team and all-area second-team both in his senior seasons.

Playing career

College
He played college football at Hofstra University in his first three seasons before transferring to Old Dominion for his senior season.

National Football League

Denver Broncos
On July 26, 2011, he signed with the Denver Broncos as an undrafted free agent.

Canadian Football League

Calgary Stampeders
On May 8, 2012, Mayo signed with the Calgary Stampeders of the Canadian Football League. In his first season in the CFL, Mayo was a big contributor on special teams, amassing 15 special teams tackles: He also had 9 defensive tackles and 1 quarterback sack. In his second season Mayo became a major part of the Stamps' defensive unit. He finished the season with 57 tackles (9 special teams tackles), 5 sacks, 1 interception and 2 fumble recoveries. Following the season, on February 13, 2014, he re-signed with the Stampeders. In the 2014 CFL season Mayo continued his strong play, setting a new career high in tackles with 67; while also contributing 2 sacks, 2 fumble recoveries and 1 special teams tackle. To conclude the 2014 season, the Stampeders won the 102nd Grey Cup by defeating Hamilton 20-16. In the championship game, Mayo led the team with 7 tackles and a forced fumble. On March 9, 2015, the Stampeders and Mayo agreed to a contract extension. His retirement was made public by 3DownNation on April 10, 2018

Coaching career

New England Patriots
In 2018, Deron was hired by the New England Patriots as the assistant strength and conditioning coach.

Personal life
Mayo has two brothers, Jerod and Derek, who both played football as linebackers. Jerod played college football at Tennessee and was a first round pick for the New England Patriots of the NFL. He played with the team from 2008 to 2015, winning a Super Bowl. Jerod is now the inside linebackers coach for the Patriots. Derek played college football at the University of Richmond, where he was a member of the 2008 Richmond Spiders NCAA FCS National Championship team.

References

External links
Hofstra bio
Old Dominion bio
Calgary Stampeders bio 

1988 births
Living people
African-American coaches of American football
African-American players of American football
American football linebackers
Canadian football linebackers
Hofstra Pride football players
Old Dominion Monarchs football players
Denver Broncos players
Calgary Stampeders players
American players of Canadian football
Players of American football from Virginia
New England Patriots coaches
21st-century African-American sportspeople
20th-century African-American people